The 1984 British motorcycle Grand Prix was the tenth round of the 1984 Grand Prix motorcycle racing season. It took place on the weekend of 3–5 August 1984 at the Silverstone Circuit.

Classification

500 cc

References

British motorcycle Grand Prix
British
Motorcycle Grand Prix
British motorcycle Grand Prix